Woodlands is a rural municipality in the province of Manitoba in Western Canada. It lies in the southern part of the Interlake and is named for the community of Woodlands, which itself is named for the wooded lands of the area.

History
The Rural Municipality of Woodlands was incorporated on February 14, 1884.

Geography

Communities
 Erinview
 Lake Francis
 Marquette
 Reaburn
 Warren
 Woodlands

Climate

Demographics 

Government

The Rural Municipality of Woodlands is municipal style government with one head of council and six councillors, one of which is the deputy reeve. The councillors are elected at large. The municipal offices are located in Woodlands. The municipalities lies within the federal riding of Selkirk—Interlake—Eastman, represented by Conservative James Bezan, and the provincial riding of Lakeside represented by Progressive Conservative Ralph Eichler.

2022 Members of Council 
 Reeve: Douglas Oliver
 Councillor: Lorna Broadfoot
 Councillor: Carl Fleury
 Councillor: Darryl Langrell
 Councillor: Darrell Sincalir
 Councillor: Bryan Myskiw
 Councillor: Valerie Stelck 

The representatives from the local urban district of Warren are Judy Olson, Diana Friesen, and Cal Martin.

<mbvotes.ca>

Transportation 
The first rail line, the Air Line, connected Warren to Stonewall and Winnipeg, and later to Portage la Prairie, but was taken out of service in 1882. The Hudson Bay CPR line was built to Shoal Lake, but construction stopped after 1886 due to lack of funds. In the 1880s, multiple rail lines were built through the municipality to transport gravel from the ridges and pits, but were later abandoned once supply diminished. The Canadian Northern Railroad was built through the area from 1903 to 1904. The section north of Warren was abandoned beginning in 1996, but the section south remains in operation.

See also 
Twin Lakes Beach, Manitoba

External links
 Official website

References 

Woodlands